This is a list of all tornadoes that were confirmed by local offices of the National Weather Service in the United States from August to September 2014.

United States yearly total

August

August 4 event

August 6 event

August 9 event

August 11 event

August 12 event

August 13 event

August 15 event

August 16 event

August 17 event

August 18 event

August 20 event

August 21 event

August 23 event

August 24 event

August 25 event

August 28 event

August 31 event

September

September 1 event

September 2 event

September 4 event

September 6 event

September 7 event

September 8 event

September 9 event

September 10 event

September 17 event

September 19 event

September 20 event

September 21 event

September 27 event

September 29 event

September 30 event

See also
 Tornadoes of 2014

Footnotes

References

Tornadoes of 2014
2014, 08
August 2014 events in the United States
September 2014 events in the United States